Tuca is the nickname of multiple individuals:

 Ricardo Ferretti, Brazilian-Mexican footballer and manager
 Benjamín Pardo, fictional character in the Argentine telenovela Graduados
 Tuca (footballer) (born 1981), Juliano Francisco de Paula, Brazilian football defender
 Tuca (Brazilian musician), born Valeniza Zagni da Silva, Brazilian guitarist, songwriter, and singer

TUCA is also an acronym for:
 Teatro da Pontifícia Universidade Católica de São Paulo
 Trade Union Confederation of the Americas.